Allodahlia is a genus of earwigs in the family Forficulidae.

Species 
The genus contains the following species:

 Allodahlia ahrimanes (Burr, 1900)
 Allodahlia ancylura (Dohrn, 1865) (= Allodahlia spinosa Brindle, 1966)
 Allodahlia bispina Bey-Bienko, 1959
 Allodahlia coriacea (de Bormans, 1894) (= Allodahlia signata Bey-Bienko, 1970)
 Allodahlia dineshi Gangola, 1965
 Allodahlia guptae Kapoor, 1968
 Allodahlia julkai Srivastava, 1978
 Allodahlia macropyga (Westwood, 1836) (= Allodahlia huegeli (Dohrn, 1865))
 Allodahlia martensi Brindle, 1974
 Allodahlia ochroptera Brindle, 1972
 Allodahlia oxypyga Bey-Bienko, 1970
 Allodahlia scabriuscula (Audinet-Serville, 1838) (= Allodahlia brachynota (Haan, 1842))

References 

Forficulidae
Dermaptera genera
Taxa named by Karl Wilhelm Verhoeff